Zaraiskites is an extinct genus of ammonoid cephalopod that lived during the Tithonian.

Zaraiskites has a ribbed evolute shell without tubercles. Inner whorls are with normal bifurcate or triplicate ribbing; outer whorl is with virgatotome ribbing with as many as seven secondary ribs taking off successively in front of each primary rib.

Related genera in the Virgatitinae include Acuticostites and Virgatites

Distribution
Only found at Kuibyshev Reservoir, Volga River, Russia.

References
Notes

Bibliography
W.J Arkell, et al., Mesozoic Ammonoidea; Treatise  on Invertebrate Paleontology, Part L, 1957. Geological Society of America and University of Kansas Press.
V.V. Mitta, 1993. The Systematic Composition of the Middle Volgian Virgatitidae (Ammonoidea) of Central Asia.  Paleontological Journal 27(4). 

Late Jurassic ammonites
Fossils of Russia
Ammonitida genera
Perisphinctidae